Karen Trines (born December 15, 1986 in Ottawa as Karen Sagle) is a Canadian curler from Nepean, Ontario. She currently plays lead for Team Mann on the World Curling Tour.

Career
Trines twice represented Ontario at the Canadian Junior Curling Championships. The first time in 2005 with skip Erin Morrissey, and the second in 2007 with skip Hollie Nicol (now Duncan).

During the 2011–12 curling season, Trines skipped her own rink on the World Curling Tour, playing in just one event, the 2011 Royal LePage OVCA Women's Fall Classic, where her team went 4–3 and missed the playoffs. After the season, she joined the Lisa Farnell rink at second position. She won her first WCT event at the 2013 Challenge Chateau Cartier de Gatineau. The Farnell rink dissolved in 2014, with third Erin Morrissey taking over the rink, and Trines moving up to third. Sagle won a provincial mixed title in April 2015, playing lead for Mike McLean.

In 2015, it was announced the Trines would be joining the Jenn Hanna rink. The Team won the 2016 Ontario Scotties Tournament of Hearts and represented Ontario at the 2016 Scotties Tournament of Hearts, where they missed the playoffs, finishing with a 6–5 record. After the season, it was announced that Hanna was retiring from competitive curling and that Trines would be joining the Hollie Duncan rink, a skip she had previously played for in juniors in 2007. Her new team would win the 2018 Ontario Scotties Tournament of Hearts sending them to the 2018 Scotties Tournament of Hearts. There, they posted a 4–3 round robin record which qualified them for the tiebreaker against Newfoundland and Labrador's Stacie Curtis. Ontario scored three in the ninth end and stole two in the tenth for a 11–8 win and a spot in the Championship Pool. They would not win any more games, finishing the tournament with a 4–7 record. The following season, they failed to qualify for the playoffs at the 2019 Ontario Scotties Tournament of Hearts after losing the tiebreaker 10-5 to Julie Tippin.

Team Duncan started the 2019–20 season with a quarterfinal finish at the 2019 Cameron's Brewing Oakville Fall Classic despite qualifying for the playoffs as the number one seed.

Personal life
Trines has a Bachelor of Arts from Carleton University and an Event Management Graduate Certificate from Algonquin College. She currently works as a Senior Program Analyst at Sport Canada, and is the owner of When Sparks Fly Weddings & Events. It is believed that she and former teammate Brit O'Neill were the first ever open LGBT couple to play at the Scotties Tournament of Hearts. She is now married to Kat Trines.

References

External links

Living people
1986 births
Curlers from Ottawa
Canadian women curlers
Canadian LGBT sportspeople
Lesbian sportswomen
LGBT curlers
Carleton University alumni
Algonquin College alumni